"Acquainted" is a song by Canadian singer the Weeknd recorded for his second studio album Beauty Behind the Madness (2015). It was written and produced by him along with Jason "DaHeala" Quenneville, Danny "DannyBoyStyles" Schofield, Carlos "Illangelo" Montagnese and Ben "Billions" Diehl. The track was sent to urban contemporary stations on November 17, 2015, by XO and Republic Records, serving as the record's fifth and final single, being also released to rhythmic contemporary on February 16, 2016. It was set to impact contemporary hit radio on April 12, 2016, though its release to those stations did not occur. The song was well received by music critics upon its release, being praised for its production, catchiness and the Weeknd's vocals.

Background
A working version of "Acquainted" referred to as "Girls Born in the 90s" leaked in May 2015, before being heavily reworked prior to its release on the album.

Lyrics
On this song, the Weeknd is expressing his happiness with being “acquainted” with a certain lady, who is also the addressee. And of course she would be someone whom he is romantically involved with.

But the story is at hand not that simple. Rather this lady is presented, even by the narrator himself, as being “no good”. Indeed his homies have “warned” him about getting mixed up with her “type” of woman. What type that is exactly is not specified. However, all lyrics considered, it is feasible to deduce that perhaps, in some capacity or another, she is mixed up with another man or men.
This postulation is buttressed during the third verse. It is here where we are introduced to an idea like The Weeknd, under inspiration from his mother, desiring to find a good girl. However, the “fast life keeps gaining on” him. That is a metaphor that reads as if, as expressed in many of his other songs, Abel is unable to escape the excitable celebrity lifestyle that has been made accessible to him via his fame and wealth.

Composition 
The song is written in the key of G minor with a moderate tempo of 106 beats per minute in common time.  The song alternates between the chords Gm and F, and the vocals span from F3 to C6.

Music video 
The music video was directed by Australian filmographer Nabil Elderkin. Production commenced on February 9, 2016, but the video was never officially released. However in February 2023, the music video starring the Weeknd and Monic Perez, was leaked onto the internet.

Charts

Weekly charts

Year-end charts

Certifications

Release history

References

External links
 

2015 songs
2016 singles
The Weeknd songs
Republic Records singles
Song recordings produced by Illangelo
Songs written by Illangelo
Songs written by the Weeknd
Songs written by DaHeala
XO (record label) singles
Songs written by Ben Billions
Song recordings produced by the Weeknd